The Assembly of the City and Borough of Juneau, Alaska is the governing body and legislative branch of the City and Borough of Juneau, the local government of Juneau, Alaska, United States.  As Juneau is a unified municipality, its corporate limits encompass the historic town of Juneau (or present-day downtown), suburbs both urban and rural, as well as thousands of square miles of wilderness.

The Assembly is headed by the mayor of Juneau.  The assembly consists of nine members, which includes the mayor, elected in rotating tranches to three-year terms. Elections are held on the first Tuesday of every October.

Districts
The City and Borough of Juneau operates under a council–manager form of government.  The mayor is the titular head of the city, is the presiding officer (or chair) of the Assembly, and is one of three members of that body elected areawide (or at-large).  The remaining six members are elected by district: two districts have been defined by the Assembly, as of its last redistricting in 2003:

The 2nd Assembly District is nearly identical to the state's 31st Election District, represented in the Alaska House of Representatives by Cathy Muñoz, except that the 31st District includes the Juneau Airport precinct.  The 1st Assembly District is mostly identical to the 32nd Election District represented by Sam Kito III, except for the aforementioned inclusion of Juneau Airport, in addition to the inclusion of communities outside of the CBJ: Gustavus, Kupreanof, Petersburg, Skagway and Tenakee Springs.  Excepting these communities, the areawide "district" (or CBJ boundaries as a whole) are identical to Senate District P represented by Dennis Egan.

Members

Footnotes
  Baxter resigned on April 15, 1972.
  Savikko died on September 18, 1972.
  Thomas resigned on June 15, 1972; James Duncan was appointed to replace him on July 6.
  Rogers resigned on December 6, 1972; Allan Engstrom was appointed to replace him on December 12.
  Macomber resigned on October 7, 1975.
  Thomas resigned on August 3, 1976.
  Sevdy resigned on December 9, 1975. Stitt was appointed to replace him on December 23.
  Polley resigned on June 30, 1982.  C. E. Jacobsen was appointed to replace him on the same day.
  Mallott resigned.  Dennis Egan was appointed to replace him on February 13, 1995.
  Following his appointment to mayor, Cathy Muñoz was appointed to replace Egan on March 6.
  Anderson resigned on May 23, 2011. Katherine Eldemar was appointed to replace him.
  Eldemar resigned on June 24, 2011. Malcolm Menzies was appointed to replace her.
  Doll resigned on June 24, 2011.  Peter Freer was appointed to replace him on July 11.
  Fisk died on November 30, 2015. 
  Gregory resigned on August 13, 2018.
  Kiehl resigned on February 14, 2019. Alicia Hughes-Skandijs was appointed the same day to replace him.
  Crane resigned on January 20, 2016. Jaime Bursell was appointed to replace her on February 11.
  Weldon resigned from her district seat on July 31, 2018.

Appointed groups

Advisory boards
 Americans with Disabilities Act (ADA) Committee - 
 Building Code Advisory Committee
 Douglas Service Area Advisory Board
 Fisheries Development Committee
 International Relations Advisory Committee (JIRAC) -  
 Juneau Commission on Aging
 Juneau Economic Development Council (JEDC) - 
 Juneau Commission on Sustainability (JCOS)
 Juneau Historic Resources Advisory Committee (HRAC) - 
 Juneau Human Rights Commission (JHRC) - 
 Juneau International Relations Advisory Committee -  
 Juneau Public Libraries Endowment Board
 Parks and Recreation Advisory Committee (PRAC) - 
 Passenger Fee Proceeds Committee
 Social Services Advisory Board (SSAB)
 Wetlands Review Board (WRB)
 Utility Advisory Board
 Youth Activities Board (YAB) -

Appeal boards
 Animal Hearing Board
 Bidding Review Board
 Building Code Board of Appeals
 Personnel Board
 Sales Tax Board of Appeals

Enterprise and special boards
 Juneau International Airport Board - 
 Bartlett Regional Hospital Board of Directors - 
 Docks and Harbors Board - 
 Eaglecrest Ski Area Board of Directors
 Planning Commission -

Ad hoc committees, task forces, and commissions
 Capital City Emergency Planning Committee
 Economic & Employment Diversification Strategy Committee
 Fluoride Study Commission
 Juneau Convention and Visitors Bureau
 Juneau Coalition for Youth - 
 Performing Arts Center Commission
 West Douglas Development Working Group

Affiliated committees
 Friends of the Flag Committee
 Juneau & Douglas Fourth of July Committees
 Hank Harmon Rifle Range Inc.

See also
 List of mayors of Juneau, Alaska

References

External links
 

1970 establishments in Alaska
Juneau, Alaska
Local government in Alaska